Thiruvanvandoor (pronounced ) is a village Near Thiruvalla,in Chengannur Taluk in Alappuzha district, in Kerala, India.

Region
The village of Thiruvanvandoor is connected with Main Central Road at two junctions on the road. One is at Kallissery and other is at Pravin Coodu. Kallissery is the major town in Thiruvanvandoor.

Religion

Hinduism
Thiruvanvandoor lies near Pandanad, Kerala which is believed to be founded by the Pandavas during their exile period. The region of Pandanad and neighboring villages have many Hindu temples Vanavathukkara that bear historic and architectural value. A popular temples in the Thiruvanvandoor region are Thiruvanvandoor Mahashetram and Sree Gosalakrishna Temple.

Thiruvanvandoor Mahashetram and Sree Gosalakrishna Temple
sree gosalakrishna temple is the famous temple nearer to the ancient temple Thiruvanvandoor Mahashetram build by pandava (nakula),these two temples are in the same compound, nakula worshipped lord vishnu at the time of vanavasam . gosalakrishna temple was built about 50 years ago by the devotees of different kara (villages). A major event is the annual festival  where temple elephants are used. The temple is administered by Travancore Devaswom Board of the Government of Kerala. Every year on 19 May Gajamela is conducted on the last day of the temple festival.

Demographics
 India census, Thiruvanvandoor had a population of 13831 with 6618 males and 7213 females.

References

Villages in Alappuzha district